Events from the year 1693 in art.

Events
 January 11 – A massive earthquake in Sicily leads indirectly to the development of a Sicilian Baroque style of architecture and decoration as palazzi, public buildings, cathedrals and churches require reconstruction.

Paintings

 Wang Hui – A Thousand Peaks and Myriad Ravines
 Hyacinthe Rigaud – Portrait of Crown Prince Frederick of Denmark
 Jan Wyck – The Battle of the Boyne (approximate date)

Births
 May 31 – Bartolomeo Nazari, Italian portraitist (died 1758)
 date unknown
 Placido Campolo, Italian painter of the late-Baroque period (died 1743)
 Georg Rafael Donner, Austrian sculptor (died 1741)
 Zheng Xie, Chinese painter of orchids, bamboo, and stones; one of the Eight Eccentrics of Yangzhou (died 1765)
 probable – Bernardino Ludovisi, Italian sculptor (died 1749)

Deaths
 April 20 – Claudio Coello, Spanish Baroque painter (born 1642)
 July 31 – Willem Kalf, Dutch painter (born 1619)
 November – Nicolaes Maes, Dutch Baroque painter of genre works and portraits (born 1634)
 November 12 – Maria van Oosterwijck, Dutch Baroque painter, specializing in richly detailed still-lifes (born 1630)
 December 13 – Willem van de Velde the Elder, Dutch painter (born 1611)
 date unknown
 Johann Franz Ermels, German painter and engraver (born 1641)
 Dirck Ferreris, Dutch Golden Age painter (born 1639)
 Hendrik Graauw, Dutch Golden Age painter (born 1627)
 Bartolomé Pérez, Spanish painter of flowers and still lifes (born 1634)
 Giovan Battista Ruoppolo, Neapolitan painter, notable for still-lifes (born 1629)
 Johann Weikhard von Valvasor, Carniolan nobleman, scientist, writer, draughtsman, and polymath (born 1641)

 
Years of the 17th century in art
1690s in art